Abu'l-Nasr Muhammad (died ca. 1010) was the last Farighunid ruler of Guzgan from 1000 to 1010. He was the son and successor of Abu'l Haret Ahmad.

Biography 
Abu'l-Nasr Muhammad is first mentioned during the late 990s, when his father made an alliance with the Ghaznavid family by double marriage; Abu'l-Nasr Muhammad married Sebüktigin's daughter, while Sebüktigin's son Mahmud married one of Abu'l Haret's daughters.

In 1000, Abu'l-Nasr's father died, and thus he succeeded him, and became a vassal of the Ghaznavids, which had become a powerful military power, and had already imposed their authority on other petty Iranian kingdoms. Abu'l-Nasr enjoyed the confidence of Mahmud; in 1008 he fought in the center of the Ghaznavid line against the Karakhanids outside Balkh and in the following year escorted Mahmud during his campaign in India. He also married off a daughter to Mahmud's son Mohammad Ghaznavi. When Abu'l-Nasr died in around 1010, Mohammad took over the rule of Guzgan, even though Abu'l-Nasr had left a son, Hasan. This marked the end of Farighunid rule.

Sources 
Bosworth, C. E. "ĀL-E FARĪḠŪN." Encyclopedia Iranica. 1 August 2012. <http://www.iranicaonline.org/articles/al-e-farigun-a-minor-iranian-dynasty-of-guzgan->
 

1010 deaths
10th-century births
10th-century Iranian people
11th-century Iranian people
Farighunids
11th-century monarchs in Asia
Ghaznavid generals
Rulers of Guzgan